Nola Ishmael OBE (born 1943) is a Barbadian nurse who became the first black or minority ethnic director of nursing in London.

She was appointed OBE in the 2000 birthday honours list.

A portrait of Ishmael, a 2006 photograph by Julia Fullerton-Batten, is held in the National Portrait Gallery.

References

External links
 "Becoming the first black nursing director in London", BBC News, 25 June 2018.

1943 births
Living people
British women nurses
Barbadian emigrants to England
Members of the Order of the British Empire
Nurses from London
Black British people in health professions